Scotty Crockett (born August 20, 1979) is an American former stock car racing driver. Crockett competed in 2 NASCAR Craftsman Truck Series races during the 2008 season for DGM Racing.

References 

1979 births
Living people
NASCAR drivers
People from Land o' Lakes, Florida
Sportspeople from Florida